Platea, known as 肖榄属 (xiao lan shu) in Mandarin, is a genus in the Metteniusaceae found in tropical and subtropical Asia. It is a small genus of mostly dioecious trees that grow in high-elevation forests.

Description
Platea is a genus of predominantly dioecious trees with spirally arranged leathery leaves. Plants may grow up to 45 meters tall. The young shoots and branches are covered with stellate (star-shaped) trichomes or simple hairs. The staminate (male) flowers are arranged in panicles and the pistillate (female) flowers in racemes. The flowers are pentamerous (floral parts arranged in five), with female flowers lacking petals. The stigma is sessile and disc-shaped, and the ovaries are cylindrical. The fruits are cylindrical drupes that are blue-black when ripe with a woody endocarp.

Taxonomy and naming
Platea was once placed in the Icacinaceae. After the Icacinaceae were split into four smaller families, Platea was transferred to the Metteniusaceae. As of February 2023, it consists of 8 accepted species:
 Platea bullata Sleumer
 Platea excelsa Blume
 Platea hongiaoensis Tagane
 Platea kachinensis Y.H.Tan & H.B.Ding
 Platea latifolia Blume
 Platea malayana Utteridge
 Platea parvifolia Merr. & Chun
 Platea sclerophylla Sleumer

References

External links
 

Metteniusaceae
Asterid genera